Hinduism is a minority faith in Brazil followed by approximately 0.01% of its population. Hinduism in Brazil is represented mainly by Ananda Marga, Brahma Kumaris and the Osho Institute Brazil, ISKCON, Yoga In Bound, Brasil Gaudiya Math and Sri Chaitanya Saraswat Math e Organização Vrinda de Paramadweit. The vedic astrology is also becoming popular due to Academia Brasileira de Astrologia Védica.

Demographics
According to the 2000 census, there were about 2,905 Hindus in Brazil. According to the 2011 census, there were about 9,500 Hindus in Brazil constituting 0.005% of the population of Brazil. As of 2020, there were 21,200 (0.01%) Hindus in Brazil according to ARDA.

Contemporary Society
In 2018, the entrance gate of ISKCON Temple situated in Curitiba, Brazil was targeted by unknown perpetrators. The painting of Krishna with his mother Yashoda was defaced.

See also

Hinduism in Guyana
Hinduism in South America

External links

References

Hinduism in Brazil